Mill Creek Ravine is located in Edmonton, Alberta, Canada and is a part of the River Valley parks and trail system. It contains the last stretch of Mill Creek, before it flows into a culvert for its end run to the North Saskatchewan River. The ravine ends where the land opens onto the North Saskatchewan River valley near the west end of Cloverdale on the opposite bank from downtown.

Geography
Mill Creek begins in rural sloughs east of Edmonton and flows northward, in part through the ravine park. It finally ends its run at an outfall to the North Saskatchewan River near downtown Edmonton.

The creek has its start just south and east of Anthony Henday Drive (just south of its junction with Highway 14; this is south-east of the Meadows community). The creek flows northward through Mill Woods and the Jackie Parker Recreation Area, then is diverted into culverts (built during the 1960s and 1970s). It flows underneath the Davies/Coronet Industrial areas. 

The creek returns to the surface north of Argyll Road and flows through the Mill Creek Ravine park. 

The creek is diverted to a tunnel and concrete outfall structure north of 88th Avenue. The outfall lies near 92 Avenue between the neighborhoods of Strathcona, Cloverdale and Bonnie Doon. The outfall emerges on the south/east bank of the North Saskatchewan River several meters above the river at approximately 95 Avenue. It is clearly visible from the James MacDonald Bridge. The city has begun public consultations on re-establishing the natural, surface flow ("daylighting") the downstream reach of Mill Creek.

History 
The creek's name is derived from a flour mill that was established by William Bird in 1878 near where the creek flows into the North Saskatchewan River. 

The ravine was once home to part of the Edmonton, Yukon & Pacific Railway line. The line ran from the Canadian Pacific line (the Calgary & Edmonton Railway) at about 67 Avenue, across 99 Street and down into Mill Creek ravine. The rail-line went down through the ravine and across the Low Level Bridge, built in 1900. The railway carried passengers and also served ravine industries -- a brickyard, a coal mine and two meat packing plants. Gainer's meat packing plant, a large scale meat packing facility, was once located on the western edge of the ravine at 79 Avenue.In 1954 most of the railway through the ravine was abandoned, with only the section serving Gainer's, running from 79 Avenue to the CPR line, remaining in use. This section as well was abandoned, by 1980. 

In the early 1980s the City of Edmonton converted the railway right of way between 67 Avenue to the river into a paved bicycle path, later designated a multi-use trail. Four of the original wooden railway trestles were used by the path. The largest of these, the Mill Creek Trestle at 76 Avenue, was recognized as a Municipal Historic Resource in 2004 and still stands. The three shorter trestles were extensively rehabilitated in 2017–18, with the shortest one being completely replaced. Concrete abutments were added, concrete footings were placed under wooden pilings, all mid-stream pilings were replaced with trusses, and the bridge decks were widened. The original wood from the trestles was reused where possible. In 1988 the Edmonton Historical Board erected a plaque in Mill Creek Park commemorating the railway.

Local residents and nature enthusiasts fought successfully to prevent the city from installing a freeway through the ravine in the 1960s and 1970s.

The city has begun public consultations on re-establishing the natural, surface flow ("daylighting") the downstream reach of Mill Creek, north of 88th Avenue.

The Mill Creek Outdoor Swimming Pool, located in the ravine at 8200 - 95A Street, is a popular summertime destination. Other nearby attractions include the Argyll Velodrome and BMX course and the Muttart Conservatory.

Notable events 
On July 4, 1908, two people drowned in Mill Creek in isolated incidents, two hours apart from each other. Both drownings occurred at the same location, where the creek connected with the North Saskatchewan River.

In 1996 Hisaya Okymia, a young boy, drowned in the creek, near the heritage trestle bridge.

Communities

Strathcona
Bonnie Doon
Ritchie
King Edward Park
Hazeldean
Avonmore
Argyll
Greenview
Jackson Heights
Minchau
Kiniski Gardens
Wild Rose
Silver Berry
Tamarack
Aster

See also
List of rivers of Alberta

External links 
 City of Edmonton information: Mill Creek Ravine

Notes

North Saskatchewan River
Rivers of Alberta
Valleys of Alberta
Landforms of Edmonton
Parks in Edmonton
Rail trails in Alberta
Rail infrastructure in Alberta